Omox is a small genus of combtooth blennies found in the western Pacific Ocean.

Species
There are currently two recognized species in this genus:
 Omox biporos V. G. Springer, 1972 (Omox blenny)
 Omox lupus V. G. Springer, 1981 (Wolf blenny)

References

 
Blenniinae
Taxa named by Victor G. Springer
Marine fish genera